The women's 100 metres event at the 2018 Asian Games was held at the Gelora Bung Karno Stadium, Jakarta, Indonesia on 25–26 August 2018.

Schedule
All times are Western Indonesia Time (UTC+07:00)

Records

Results
Legend
DNS — Did not start

Round 1
 Qualification: First 3 in each heat (Q) and the next 4 fastest (q) advance to the semifinals.

Heat 1
 Wind: −1.2 m/s

Heat 2
 Wind: −0.6 m/s

Heat 3
 Wind: −0.1 m/s

Heat 4
 Wind: +0.1 m/s

Semifinals
 Qualification: First 3 in each heat (Q) and the next 2 fastest (q) advance to the final.

Heat 1 
 Wind: −0.5 m/s

Heat 2 
 Wind: +0.1 m/s

Final
 Wind: +0.3 m/s

References

Results

100 metres women
2018 women